The carte de visite (visiting card), abbreviated CdV, was a type of small photograph which was patented in Paris by photographer André Adolphe Eugène Disdéri in 1854, although first used by Louis Dodero. Each photograph was the size of a visiting card, and such photograph cards were commonly traded among friends and visitors in the 1860s. Albums for the collection and display of cards became a common fixture in Victorian parlors. The immense popularity of these card photographs led to the publication and collection of photographs of prominent persons.

History and format
The carte de visite was usually made of an albumen print, which was a thin paper photograph mounted on a thicker paper card. The size of a carte de visite is  ×  mounted on a card sized  × . In 1854, Disdéri had also patented a method of taking eight separate negatives on a single plate, which reduced production costs. The carte de visite was slow to gain widespread use until 1859, when Disdéri published Emperor Napoleon III's photos in this format. This made the format an overnight success. The new invention was so popular that its usage became known as "cardomania" and spread quickly throughout Europe and then to America and the rest of the world.

Cabinet cards remained popular into the early 20th century, when Kodak introduced the Brownie camera and home snapshot photography became a mass phenomenon.

American Civil War 
The carte de visite photograph proved to be a very popular item during the American Civil War. Soldiers, friends and family members would have a means of inexpensively obtaining photographs and sending them to loved ones in small envelopes. Photos of Abraham Lincoln, Ulysses S. Grant, and other celebrities of the era became instant hits in the North. People were not only buying photographs of themselves, but also collecting photographs of celebrities.<ref>Schweitzer, Marlis, and Joanne Zerdy. 2014. [https://books.google.com/books?id=MEJvBAAAQBAJ&pg=PT48&dq= Performing Objects and Theatrical Things]. Houndmills, Basingstoke; New York : Palgrave Macmillan. .</ref>

 Gallery of cartes de visite 

See also
 Business card
 Cabinet card
 Postcard
 Trading card

 Notes 

 References 
 
 Dr. Robert Leggat MA M.Ed Ph.D. FRPS FRSA
 Newhall, Beaumont. The history of photograph (1964)
 
 Welling, William. Photography in America'' (1978 & 1987)

External links 
 Portraits of Scientists: Increase Lapham's Cartes-de-visite Collection Collected by pioneering Wisconsin antiquarian Increase A. Lapham between 1862–75, this album of carte-de-visite photographic portraits depicts many notable 19th-century scientists from America and Europe. Available on Wisconsin Historical Images, the Wisconsin Historical Society's online image database.
 University of Washington Libraries Digital Collections – 19th Century Actors Photographs Cartes-de-visite studio portraits of entertainers, actors, singers, comedians and theater managers who were involved with or performed on the American stage in the mid-to-late 19th century.
 William Emerson Strong Photograph Album -- Duke University Libraries Digital Collections 200 cartes de visite depicting officers in the Confederate Army and Navy, officials in the Confederate government, famous Confederate wives, and other notable figures of the Confederacy. Also included are 64 photographs attributed to Mathew Brady.
 Southern Cartes de Visite Collection, A.S. Williams III American Collection, Division of Special Collections, University of Alabama Libraries. Over 3300 digitized cartes de visite, the majority of them from southern studios.
 The Carte de Visite file at the New-York Historical Society
 Cartes de Visite of California photographers at Beinecke Library via flickr

Ephemera
Photographic techniques dating from the 19th century
Portrait photography